Karlheinz Meininger (born 1 February 1953) is a German former professional footballer who played as a forward.

Career
Between 1981 and 1994 Meininger was with Atlas Delmenhorst, first as a player and later as assistant coach and manager.

Personal life
As of September 2018, he was working in a football school in Zwiesel, Bavaria.

References

External links
 

Living people
1953 births
German footballers
Association football forwards
Bundesliga players
2. Bundesliga players
TSV 1860 Munich players
1. FC Nürnberg players
SV Werder Bremen players
Rot-Weiss Essen players
20th-century German people